Along Came Ruth is a 1924 American comedy film starring Viola Dana. The film was directed by Edward F. Cline and written by Winifred Dunn, based on Holman Francis Day's play of the same name, itself based on the play La Demoiselle de magasin by Belgians Frantz Fonson and Fernand Wicheler. Viola Dana was one of the top stars of the newly amalgamated MGM, a lively comedian who enjoyed a long career that faded with the emergence of the talkies.

Synopsis
Ruth (Viola Dana) is a small-town live-wire who takes over a furniture shop and its owner's nephew.

Cast

Preservation
With no prints of Along Came Ruth located in any film archives, it is lost film.

References

External links

1924 films
American black-and-white films
Silent American comedy films
Metro-Goldwyn-Mayer films
American silent feature films
1924 comedy films
Films directed by Edward F. Cline
Lost American films
1924 lost films
Lost comedy films
1920s American films